Dustin Ybarra (born October 30, 1989) is an American stand-up comedian and actor. He is known for his role as Tyler Medina in Kevin (Probably) Saves the World, and roles in We Bought a Zoo and Hop.

Ybarra's career began with stand-up comedy performances in Texas, where he was a finalist in the Funniest Dallas Comic and Funniest Comic in Texas competitions.

Early life
Ybarra was born in San Antonio, Texas. He lived in New Braunfels, Austin, and Daingerfield before graduating from Trinity High School (Euless, Texas).

Filmography

Film

Television

References

External links
 Official website
 

Living people
Male actors from Texas
American male film actors
American male television actors
American male comedians
American stand-up comedians
21st-century American comedians
Male actors from San Antonio
People from New Braunfels, Texas
Male actors from Austin, Texas
People from Daingerfield, Texas
1989 births